Stadionul Municipal is a multi-use stadium in Alexandria, Romania currently undergoing reconstruction. It is used mostly for football matches and is the home ground of CSM Alexandria and Universitatea Alexandria. The stadium holds 5,000 people.

References

Football venues in Romania
Buildings and structures in Teleorman County